The 2016 State of Origin series was the 35th time the annual best-of-three series between the Queensland and New South Wales rugby league teams to be played entirely under 'state of origin' rules (1980 and 1981 were only one game series).

The Maroons were the defending champions, but had a new coach in Kevin Walters, following the appointment of Mal Meninga to the position of Australian head coach.

Game I

Game II

Game III

Player Debuts

Game 1 

  Cap no. 258 Josh Mansour
  Cap no. 259 Matt Moylan
  Cap no. 260 Adam Reynolds
  Cap no. 261 Dylan Waker
  Cap no. 183 Kevin Wehbe
  Cap no. 184 Justin O'Neill

Game 2 

  Cap no. 262 Jack Bird
  Cap no. 263 Tyson Frizell

Game 3 

  Cap no. 264 James Tedesco
  Cap no. 265 Wade Graham
  Cap no. 185 Gavin Cooper

Residents

Under-20s

Women's Interstate Challenge

References

State of Origin series